Two Places at the Same Time is the third studio album from Raydio, the group led by session guitarist/songwriter/producer Ray Parker Jr.

History
Like the two albums that came before it, it again features 8 tracks; one of them, "Until The Morning Comes" was written by Parker and vocalist Arnell Carmichael. For another song, "Tonight's The Night", Parker teamed up with famed keyboard player Herbie Hancock, and Hancock received a co-writing credit.

The album featured another pop hit; though it wasn't as successful, the title track reached number 30 on the pop charts, number 6 on the R&B charts, and number 34 on the UK Singles Chart. The second single, "For Those Who Like To Groove", charted at number 14 on R&B. The album itself reached a peak of number 33. A quick clipping of the album's first song, "It's Time to Party Now", appeared in the background of the following year's Paul Newman crime drama movie, Fort Apache, The Bronx in a scene where Paul Newman's character is arresting prostitutes in an attempt to get leads on the murders of two rookie officers at the movie's beginning.

Track listing

Personnel

Raydio
Ray Parker Jr. – vocals, guitars, bass, keyboards, synthesizer
Arnell Carmichael – vocals
Darren Carmichael – vocals
Charles Fearing – guitars
Larry Tolbert – drums

Additional musicians
Jack Ashford – tambourine
Ollie E. Brown – drums, percussion, special effects
Gary Coleman – vibraphone
Horatio Gordon – saxophone, flute
Herbie Hancock – piano, Moog
Ken Peterson – trumpet, flugelhorn
Sylvester Rivers – string ensemble
Deborah Thomas – backing vocals

Production
Produced, Engineered & Mixed By Ray Parker Jr.
Mastered By Bernie Grundman

Charts

Singles

Certifications

References

External links
 Two Places at the Same Time at Discogs

1980 albums
Arista Records albums
Raydio albums
Albums produced by Ray Parker Jr.